The Government Palace, known before 1962 as Gouvernement général, is the office of the Prime Minister of Algeria and a major public building in Algiers. At the time of its inauguration in 1933, with a surface of 33,000 m2, it was the largest administrative building of the entire French state.

History

The project to build a new seat for the government of French Algeria was formulated in the context of the 100th anniversary of the Invasion of Algiers in 1830. The complex was built between 1929 and 1934 on a design by architect Jacques Guiauchain, the grandson of one of French Algeria's first colonial architects, and eventually inaugurated in 1933.

On , newly arrived Prime Minister of France Charles de Gaulle gave a major speech from the Government Palace's balcony, where he uttered the ambiguous sentence that immediately became iconic,  ("I have understood you").

After the country's independence in 1962 following the Algerian War, the building became the office and residence of the Prime Minister of Algeria.

Urban setting

The Government Palace crowns the Boulevard Mohamed-Khemisti, a monumental perspective created in the early 20th century on former military grounds, which also includes the Grande Poste d'Alger. The plaza or Forum in front of the Government Palace, formerly an open space but now closed to the public, overlooks Algiers with a broad view towards the sea. Bordering that forum is also the Central Library Arts And Culture, a public library. Just below it, in a public garden, stands the Memorial to the Liberation of Algeria.

See also
 People's National Assembly building (Algiers)
 Palace of the Council of the Nation (Algiers)
 People's Palace (Algiers)
 El Mouradia Palace

Notes

Government buildings in Algeria
Buildings and structures in Algiers